K. Thangavel (6 October 1951 – 13 September 2020) was an Indian politician who served as member of Tamil Nadu Legislative Assembly from 2011 to 2016.

Life 
Thangavel was born on 6 October 1951 in Tiruppur, Tamil Nadu. He kept living in Tiruppur.

He started his political career as a forefront leader of Centre of Indian Trade Unions in Tiruppur. He led a 127 day long strike of labor demanding dearness allowance in 1984. From 2006 to 2011 he was a local politician in Tiruppur.

In 2011 was elected as member of the Tamil Nadu Legislative Assembly from the Tiruppur South constituency. He represented the Communist Party of India (Marxist) party. He served until 2016. Thangavel was admitted to a local hospital in Coimbatore in late August 2020. He died from COVID-19 on 13 September 2020, twenty three days short of his 69th birthday during the COVID-19 pandemic in India.

References

External links 
 

1951 births
2020 deaths
Communist Party of India (Marxist) politicians from Tamil Nadu
Tamil Nadu MLAs 2011–2016
People from Tiruppur
Deaths from the COVID-19 pandemic in India